Jack McConnell nicknamed "Bluey" was an Australian rugby league footballer who played in the 1930s.  McConnell played for Western Suburbs and  Canterbury-Bankstown.  McConnell was a foundation player for Canterbury-Bankstown.

Playing career
McConnell made his first grade debut for Western Suburbs in Round 3 1933 against Newtown at Marrickville Oval.  Western Suburbs only managed to win 4 games in 1933 and finished with the wooden spoon by coming last.

In 1934, McConnell played 17 games as Western Suburbs went from wooden spooners to premiers by claiming the minor premiership and then defeating Eastern Suburbs in the 1934 grand final with McConnell playing at second row.  As of 2019, Western Suburbs are the last team to have gone from wooden spooners to premiers the following season.

In 1935, McConnell joined newly admitted Canterbury-Bankstown and played in the club's first ever game against North Sydney at North Sydney Oval on 25 April 1935.  Norths went on to win the match 20-5 with McConnell playing at second row.

In 1936, McConnell was a part of the club's first ever finals campaign as Canterbury finished 2nd on the table.  Canterbury went on to lose their semi final game against Eastern Suburbs.  This in turn would be McConnell's last game in first grade.

References

Australian rugby league players
Canterbury-Bankstown Bulldogs players
Western Suburbs Magpies players
New South Wales City Origin rugby league team players
Rugby league players from Sydney
Rugby league props
Rugby league second-rows
Year of birth missing
Place of birth missing
Year of death missing
Place of death missing